The Olaf Lee House was built in 1905 in Saint Paul, Minnesota, United States, and is listed on the National Register of Historic Places. The house is significant for its sophisticated Swiss Chalet and American Craftsman design by Clarence H. Johnston, Sr.

References

American Craftsman architecture in Minnesota
Houses completed in 1905
Houses in Saint Paul, Minnesota
Houses on the National Register of Historic Places in Minnesota
National Register of Historic Places in Saint Paul, Minnesota
1905 establishments in Minnesota